Nigea Carter (born September 1, 1973) is a former wide receiver for Michigan State Spartans football team. In his total of 4 years (1993-1996) of playing with Michigan State, he had a total of 81 receptions, 1,413 receiving yards, and 10 touchdowns.

College career
Carter chose to play for Michigan State after initially committing to Tennessee.

On October 29, 1994, in a game against Indiana, Carter caught a 93-yard touchdown pass, helping the Spartans to a 27–21 victory.

In 1995, in a game against Michigan, Tony Banks led an 88-yard drive and threw the winning touchdown to Carter with 1:24 left in the game to win 28–25 over the No. 7 ranked Wolverines.

Professional career
Carter was the 197 pick in round six of the 1997 NFL Draft by the Tampa Bay Buccaneers. Carter did not make the final roster.

References

1974 births
Living people
Michigan State Spartans football players
Tampa Bay Buccaneers players
People from Coconut Creek, Florida
Sportspeople from Broward County, Florida